Carlo Bagno (21 March 1920 – 19 January 1990) was an Italian actor.

Life and career 
Born in Lendinara, Rovigo, Bagno studied acting at the Accademia Nazionale di Arte Drammatica Silvio D'Amico, graduating in 1941.

Bagno was mainly active on stage, where he was appreciated especially as an actor of Ruzante plays and as a member of the Piccolo Teatro in Milan.

Bagno was also active on radio, television and cinema. In 1978 he won a Nastro d'Argento for best supporting actor for his performance in Luigi Magni's In the Name of the Pope King.

Partial filmography 

Lo svitato (1956)
The Police Commissioner (1962) - Dr. Longo (uncredited)
Il successo (1963) - Varelli
The Terrorist (1963) - Oscar Varino
I mostri (1963) - Presiding Judge (segment "Testimone volontario")
Love in Four Dimensions (1964) - Trapattoni, il tassista (segment "Amore e alfabeto")
The Birds, the Bees and the Italians (1966) - Bepi Cristofoletto
Shoot Loud, Louder... I Don't Understand (1966) - Il maresciallo Bagnacavallo
L'immorale (1967) - Mr. Malagugini
La piazza vuota (1971)
Gli ordini sono ordini (1972)
Anno uno (1974) - Comunista milanese
Dracula in the Provinces (1975) - Head Worker
Una sera c'incontrammo (1975) - Father of Rosa
Goodnight, Ladies and Gentlemen (1976) - Macaluso an Entrant to the Disgraziometro Show
In the Name of the Pope King (1977) - Serafino - il segrario perpetuo di Colombo
Cara sposa (1977) - Elvira's companion
How to Lose a Wife and Find a Lover (1978) - Anselmo
A Dangerous Toy (1979) - Un secondino
Un dramma borghese (1979) - Doctor Vanetti
Il malato immaginario (1979) - Dr. Anzalone
Tesoro mio (1979)
Qua la mano (1980) - The Bishop
Ombre (1980) - Monica's Father
Arrivano i bersaglieri (1980) - Pio IX
Nudo di donna (1981) - Giovanni
Culo e camicia (1981) - Renato's Father
Bertoldo, Bertoldino e Cacasenno (1984)
The Two Lives of Mattia Pascal (1985) - Pellegrinotto, dattilografo
Teresa (1987) - Mate of teresa in the crashing truck (final film role)

References

External links 

1920 births
People from the Province of Rovigo
1990 deaths
Italian male stage actors
Nastro d'Argento winners
Italian male film actors
Accademia Nazionale di Arte Drammatica Silvio D'Amico alumni
20th-century Italian male actors